Matthew Smith (31 December 1897 – 16 May 1953) was a Scottish professional footballer who made over 410 appearances in the Scottish League for Kilmarnock as a forward. He captained the club and is the only player to have won two major trophies during their time at Rugby Park. He was capped by Scotland at junior level. After retiring from football, Smith coached at Ardrossan Winton Rovers and returned to Kilmarnock as a scout.

Personal life 
Smith's grandson Gordon also became a professional footballer.

Career statistics

Honours 
Kilmarnock
 Scottish Cup: 1919–20, 1928–29

References 

Scottish footballers
Association football inside forwards
Kilmarnock F.C. players
Scottish Football League players
Kilmarnock F.C. non-playing staff
1953 deaths
1897 births
Scotland junior international footballers
People from Stevenston
Footballers from North Ayrshire
Deaths from thrombosis
Ardeer Thistle F.C. players
Ayr United F.C. players
Galston F.C. players
Association football outside forwards
Ardrossan Winton Rovers F.C. non-playing staff
Scottish Junior Football Association players